Alpinioideae is a subfamily of plants in the family Zingiberaceae.

Tribes & genera

Tribe Alpinieae

 Adelmeria
 Aframomum
 Alpinia
 Amomum - synonym Elettariopsis
 Aulotandra
 Conamomum
 Cyphostigma
 Elettaria
 Epiamomum
 Etlingera
 Geocharis
 Geostachys
 Hornstedtia
 Lanxangia
 Leptosolena
 Meistera Giseke
 Plagiostachys
 Renealmia
 Siliquamomum
 Sulettaria
 Sundamomum
 Vanoverberghia
 Wurfbainia Giseke

Tribe Riedelieae

 Burbidgea
 Pleuranthodium
 Riedelia
 Siamanthus

References

External links
 
 

 
Zingiberaceae
Monocot subfamilies